Evansville is a village in Randolph County, Illinois, United States. The population was 701 at the 2010 census.

Geography
Evansville is located at  (38.089613, -89.933976).

Demographics

As of the census of 2000, there were 724 people, 298 households, and 191 families residing in the village. The racial makeup of the village was 98.90% White, 0.41% African American, 0.14% Asian, 0.28% Pacific Islander, and 0.28% from two or more races. Hispanic or Latino of any race were 0.69% of the population.

There were 298 households, out of which 29.5% had children under the age of 18 living with them, 50.0% were married couples living together, 8.1% had a female householder with no husband present, and 35.6% were non-families. 31.2% of all households were made up of individuals, and 16.4% had someone living alone who was 65 years of age or older. The average household size was 2.38 and the average family size was 3.01.

In the village, the population was spread out, with 24.9% under the age of 18, 5.7% from 18 to 24, 29.1% from 25 to 44, 21.3% from 45 to 64, and 19.1% who were 65 years of age or older. The median age was 37 years. For every 100 females, there were 93.1 males. For every 100 females age 18 and over, there were 92.9 males.

The median income for a household in the village was $32,292, and the median income for a family was $41,719. Males had a median income of $32,500 versus $20,208 for females. The per capita income for the village was $20,194. About 7.0% of families and 14.0% of the population were below the poverty line, including 25.3% of those under age 18 and 5.4% of those age 65 or over.

Government
As of 2013, the town's government is made up of Erwin "Red" Becker, President, Board of Trustees; Bethany Wunderlich, Village Clerk;  Lisa Ohms-Schoenberger, Treasurer; Darren Kempfer, Fire Chief; Rebecca Forsythe, Librarian; Darren Kempfer, Zoning Administrator; and James Braun, Superintendent.

Notable person

 Roger Wolff, pitcher for the Philadelphia Athletics, Washington Senators, Cleveland Indians and Pittsburgh Pirates

References

External links
Village of Evansville official website
The Randolph County Herald Tribune - Local newspaper

Villages in Randolph County, Illinois
Villages in Illinois
Populated places established in 1885
1885 establishments in Illinois